Philip Van Horn Weems Dodds (May 17, 1951 – October 6, 2007), credited as Phil Dodds and Philip Dodds, was an audio engineer who appeared in the 1977 motion picture Close Encounters of the Third Kind. As ARP Instruments, Inc.'s Vice President of Engineering, Dodds was on the set to install and manage the ARP 2500 synthesizer used in the movie to play the five alien tones, and to program it for the sounds the filmmakers wanted.  He had performed a similar function on other science fiction films, such as Logan's Run, and some of the early Star Trek movies.

Steven Spielberg, liking his looks, offered him a part in the movie on the spot; he spent the next nine weeks filming the now-iconic final scenes of the movie. He has considerable screen time for an extra, playing the notes on the synthesizer under the direction of several scientists and musicians, and gazing raptly up at the alien spaceship. In the film's credits, Dodds's name appears twice—once as "Jean Claude" (as Philip Dodds) and once as "ARP Musician" (as Phil Dodds). In his original script, with the working title of Watch the Skies, Spielberg had written these as two separate parts, but combined them into one character during filming.

Later vice president of R&D for Kurzweil Music, Dodds was a project analyst with Randall House Associates, Inc. in Annapolis, MD. He was the chief architect of the Sharable Content Object Reference Model (SCORM) under the guidance of the Advanced Distributed Learning (ADL) Initiative, a project of the United States Department of Defense. The ADL SCORM is widely perceived as a means to achieve interoperability, accessibility and reuse of the component pieces of web-based instruction, irrespective of Learning Management Systems.

Dodds' grandfather was Philip Van Horn Weems, pioneering founder of navigational instrument company Weems and Plath.

Dodds died from cancer on October 6, 2007, at 56 years of age.

References
Rhodes Chroma: Interview with Philip Dodds and Tony Williams

CE3K IMDB Page
Memories of Philip Dodds: We've Lost a Great Navigator, but Not Our Way
 Rhodes Chroma

External links

1951 births
2007 deaths
American male film actors
20th-century American male actors